Novogeorgiyevsk is a rural locality (a selo) in Novogeorgiyevsky Selsoviet, Limansky District, Astrakhan Oblast, Russia. The population was 530 as of 2010.

Geography 
Novogeorgiyevsk is located 23 km northeast of Liman (the district's administrative centre) by road. Zarechnoye is the nearest rural locality.

References 

Rural localities in Limansky District